Veronika Andrýsková (born 24 May 1997) is a Czech handballer for DHK Baník Most and the Czech national team.

She participated at the 2021 World Women's Handball Championship in Spain, placing 19th.

Achievements
Czech First Division:
Winner: 2021

References

External links

1997 births
Living people
People from Otrokovice
Czech female handball players
Sportspeople from the Zlín Region
21st-century Czech women